Eyes of Texas may refer to:

"The Eyes of Texas", a song set to the tune of "I've Been Working on the Railroad"
Eyes of Texas (film), a 1948 American film directed by William Witney
The Eyes of Texas (TV series)